Jim Patrick (born July 1, 1945) is an American politician and farmer serving as a member of the Idaho Senate from the 25th district. He was previously a member of the Idaho House of Representatives from 2006 to 2012. He serves as chairman of the Senate Commerce and Human Resources Committee.

Education
Patrick graduated from Filer High School and the University of Idaho.

Elections

References

External links
Jim Patrick at the Idaho Legislature
 

1945 births
Living people
Republican Party members of the Idaho House of Representatives
People from Twin Falls, Idaho
United States Army soldiers
University of Idaho alumni
21st-century American politicians